NACDA may refer to:

 National Archive of Computerized Data on Aging
 National Association of Collegiate Directors of Athletics